Oskars Gudramovičs (born July 4, 1988 in Riga) is a Latvian luger who has competed since 2004. He finished 26th in men's doubles at the FIL World Luge Championships 2007 in Igls.

Gudramovičs also finished seventh in the doubles event at the FIL European Luge Championships 2010 in Sigulda.

He qualified for the 2010 Winter Olympics where he finished 12th in the men's doubles event with Pēteris Kalniņš.

References
FIL-Luge profile

External links
 

1988 births
Living people
Latvian male lugers
Lugers at the 2010 Winter Olympics
Lugers at the 2014 Winter Olympics
Lugers at the 2018 Winter Olympics
Olympic lugers of Latvia
Sportspeople from Riga
21st-century Latvian people